I. Jordan is a British electronic music producer and DJ.

Life 
I. Jordan grew up in Doncaster, England. They studied philosophy at the University of Hull, where they became involved in the Crystal Clear DJ society, booking club nights and eventually becoming president. Following university, they moved to London in 2014. In London, they began producing music and co-managed New Atlantis, a regular "ambient social" party run in collaboration with electronic music producer and DJ Al Wootton (formally Deadboy). New Atlantis ended in 2018.

I. Jordan identifies as genderfluid and genderqueer. On 30 May 2022, they announced that they had changed their artist name from India Jordan to I. Jordan, explaining that "India Jordan really doesn’t resonate with me anymore."

Work 
I. Jordan has released four solo singles and EPs to date: DNT STP MY LV (2019), WARPER / Bulbasaur Shuffle (2019), For You (2020) and Watch Out! (2021). They have also released collaborative singles with fellow electronic artists Finn, Dance System and Fred Again.

For You 
For You was released on 20 May 2020 on Local Action. Ben Jolley, in a five-star review for NME, describes the album as a "love letter" from Jordan to themself. Resident Advisor describes For You as "ecstatic house"; DJ Mag calls it "euphoric house". Pitchfork noted that the album combines numerous genres and compared it to the work of Alan Braxe, Fred Falke, Dave Lee, and Bob Sinclar. Pitchfork also named For Yous eponymous track a best new track. The album's final track, "Dear Nan King", is an homage to the television programme Tipping the Velvet. The album's cover art was shot at Dalston Superstore, a club Vice describes as "an east London LGBTQ institution". For You ranked highly in numerous Best of 2020 lists: Resident Advisor picked it as their Number 1 Track of 2020; Crack Magazine picked it as their Number 2 Track of 2020; Pitchfork picked it as their #21 Best Song of 2020, and it also featured in Best Song of the Year lists from Mixmag, Gorilla vs. Bear, NME, The Fader and more.

Watch Out! 
Watch Out!, released on 7 May 2021 on Ninja Tune, was composed over a six-month period. Resident Advisor, comparing Watch Out! to hardcore and techno, describes it as "alive" and "kinetic". Jordan wrote portions of the album on a train journey and bike rides around London. They took inspiration from travel more generally during the production process.

References

External links 
 
 
 

Alumni of the University of Hull
British electronic musicians
Living people
People from Doncaster
Year of birth missing (living people)
Non-binary musicians
English LGBT musicians
Genderfluid people
People with non-binary gender identities